Eva Murková (born 29 May 1962 in Bojnice) is a retired long jumper who represented Czechoslovakia. Her greatest achievement was the gold medal at the European Athletics Indoor Championships in 1983. She also won silver medals in the event at the 1984 and 1985 editions. She represented Czechoslovakia at the World Championships in Athletics in 1983 and 1987. At the Czechoslovakian Athletics Championships she was a two-time 100 metres champion and a four-time long jump national champion.

International competitions

References

1962 births
Living people
Czechoslovak female long jumpers
Slovak female long jumpers
World Athletics Championships athletes for Czechoslovakia
Czechoslovak female sprinters
Slovak female sprinters
Sportspeople from Bojnice
Friendship Games medalists in athletics